KBGE (94.9 FM) is an American radio station licensed to Cannon Beach, Oregon, United States.  The station is currently owned by Manny and Dawn Barbosa, through licensee Captain Barbosa Media, LLC.

History
On September 17, 2002, the station was sold to Entercom Portland License. On July 12, 2004, the station was sold to Alc Communications and on January 6, 2005, the station was sold to Calcomm Stations Oregon.

On November 5, 2010, KCBZ changed their call letters to KQCB-FM.

Calcom Stations Oregon sold KQCB-FM to Mark and Mickie Evans' SpinLogic Enterprises, Inc. for $170,000; the sale closed on January 15, 2015.

On February 2, 2015, KQCB-FM rebranded as "94.9 The Bridge" and changed their call letters to KBGE.

Effective May 7, 2019, SpinLogic Enterprises sold KBGE to Captain Barbosa Media, LLC for $140,000. Captain Barbosa Media had been operating the station under a time brokerage agreement as part of the transaction since February 1, 2019.

References

External links

Adult album alternative radio stations in the United States
BGE
Clatsop County, Oregon
1998 establishments in Oregon
Radio stations established in 1998